Varvara Yuriyivna Akulova, born 10 January 1992 in Kryvyi Rih), daughter of circus performers Yuriy Akulov and Larysa Akulova and referred to as "The Strongest Girl In The World", was capable of lifting up to , over four times her bodyweight in 2006. In 2000, she weighed 40 kg and could lift . She has been in the Guinness Book of World Records.

Akulova, while living with her parents in Kryvyi Rih, performed in an acrobatic act with them in a circus.

References

External links
 Akulova family website
 Varvara Akulova Teen Sport Achievements

1992 births
Living people
People from Kryvyi Rih
Strongwomen
21st-century circus performers